Alderman Stephen William Moutray (born 25 February 1959) is a Democratic Unionist Party (DUP) politician in Northern Ireland. He was a Member of the Legislative Assembly (MLA) for Upper Bann from 2003 to 2016. He was also a councillor on Craigavon Borough Council, where he served as Mayor from 2010 to 2011.

Moutray was elected to Craigavon Borough Council in 2001 as a DUP councillor. He is member of all the major committees and is vice-chairman of Environmental Health Committee.

Personal life
Moutray was educated at Lurgan Junior High School and Lurgan College. After which he worked in his family business and then in the postal service. He has been a member of the Democratic Unionist Party since 1979. Married with 3 children, he has keen interest in golf, walking and cycling. He is an active member of the Free Presbyterian Church of Ulster.

References

External links
 NI Assembly webpage
 DUP website

1959 births
Living people
People from Enniskillen
Democratic Unionist Party MLAs
Northern Ireland MLAs 2003–2007
Northern Ireland MLAs 2007–2011
Northern Ireland MLAs 2011–2016
Mayors of Craigavon
Members of Craigavon Borough Council
People educated at Lurgan College
Presbyterians from Northern Ireland